Shikotan, also known as Shpanberg or Spanberg, is an island in the Kurils administered by the Russian Federation as part of Yuzhno-Kurilsky District of Sakhalin Oblast. It is claimed by Japan as the titular , organized as part of Nemuro Subprefecture of Hokkaido Prefecture. The island's primary economic activities are fisheries and fishing, with the principal marine products being cod, crab, and kelp.

Names
The English name  transcribes both the Japanese name  and the Russian name . The Japanese name derives from the Ainu Sikotan ( or ). The name combines the Ainu reflexive or embellishing prefix si- and the word kotan ("settlement, village"), used metonymically in Ainu for each of the islands of the Kurils.

The alternative Russian name Shpanberg, sometimes anglicized as Spanberg, honors Martin Spanberg, one of Vitus Bering's lieutenants who led three voyages in 1738, 1739, and 1742 that first initiated Russian diplomatic relations with Japan and helped accelerate Russian control of the Kurils.

Geography 
The island is hilly, averaging 300 metres in elevation. The shores of the island are very indented and covered with oceanic meadows. The highest altitude is 412 m. The island is formed by the volcanic rock and sandstone of the Upper Cretaceous and Cenozoic periods. There are two extinct volcanoes on Shikotan: Mount Tomari and Mount Notoro. A number of tiny islets and rocks are scattered around the coast of Shikotan. Two larger islands lie off the south coast: Griega island; and Aivazovskogo island which lies in a bay near the western end of the southern coast.

Shikotan's vegetation consists mostly of Sakhalin fir, larch, deciduous trees, bamboo underbrush, and juniper brushwood.

There are two villages: Malokurilskoye, formerly ; and Krabozavodskoye, formerly

History 
Russia recognised Japanese sovereignty over the island in the 19th century under Shimoda Treaty. In 1885, Hanasaki District, to which the island belongs, was split off of Nemuro Province and incorporated into Chishima Province.

In September 1945, during the final days of World War II, the island, which had a population of 1,038 at the time, was invaded by 600 Soviet troops. It is one of the islands (along with the Habomai Islands) which the Soviet Union agreed in 1956 to transfer to Japan in the event of a peace treaty between the two countries (such a peace treaty has never been concluded). Between the late-1950s and to the 1960s, the Soviet Union fortified the island with old tanks (mainly IS-2 and IS-3 heavy tanks) repurposed as coastal-defence artillery against a possible seaborne invasion, by digging them into the ground and employing them as fixed gun emplacements.

An earthquake and subsequent tsunami caused major damage on the island's coastline on October 4, 1994.

In popular culture 
The 2014 anime film Giovanni's Island is a fictionalized account of the fate of Japanese civilians living on Shikotan at the time of the 1945 Soviet occupation.

Gallery

See also 
 Kuril Islands dispute
 Soviet–Japanese Joint Declaration of 1956

References

External links

 Kuril Island Network - A volunteer group dedicated to raising awareness of the habitat on the Kurils
 Satellite image of Shikotan
 Ainu speaker and activist explains the meaning of the South Kuril island names

Disputed islands
Japan–Soviet Union relations
Southern Kuriles